Myristica kalkmanii is a species of plant in the family Myristicaceae. It is a tree endemic to New Guinea.

References

kalkmanii
Endemic flora of New Guinea
Trees of New Guinea
Least concern plants
Taxonomy articles created by Polbot